Lepotrema is a genus of trematodes in the family Lepocreadiidae.

Species of this genus are encountered in a wide range of fish families in the orders Tetraodontiformes and Perciformes, with one record from a Pleuronectiformes.

Species
The following species are included in the genus, according to the World Register of Marine Species:

 Lepotrema acanthochromidis Bray, Cutmore & Cribb, 2018 
 Lepotrema adlardi (Bray, Cribb & Barker, 1993) Bray & Cribb, 1996
 Lepotrema amansis Bray, Cutmore & Cribb, 2018 
 Lepotrema amblyglyphidodonis Bray, Cutmore & Cribb, 2018 
 Lepotrema canthescheniae Bray & Cribb, 1996
 Lepotrema cirripectis Bray, Cutmore & Cribb, 2018 
 Lepotrema clavatum Ozaki, 1932 
 Lepotrema cylindricum (Wang, 1989) Bray, Cutmore & Cribb, 2018 
 Lepotrema hemitaurichthydis Bray, Cutmore & Cribb, 2018 
 Lepotrema incisum (Hanson, 1955) Bray & Cribb, 1996
 Lepotrema justinei Bray, Cutmore & Cribb, 2018 
 Lepotrema melichthydis Bray, Cutmore & Cribb, 2018 
 Lepotrema monile Bray & Cribb, 1998
 Lepotrema moretonense Bray, Cutmore & Cribb, 2018 
 Lepotrema navodonis (Shen, 1986) Bray, Cutmore & Cribb, 2018 
 Lepotrema xanthichthydis (Yamaguti, 1970) Bray & Cribb, 1996

References

Plagiorchiida
Trematode genera